As populations age, caring for people with dementia has become more common. Elderly care giving may consist of formal care and informal care. Formal care involves the services of community and medical partners, while informal care involves the support of family, friends, and local communities, but more often from spouses, adult children, and other relatives. In most mild to medium cases of dementia, the caregiver is a family member, usually a spouse or an adult child. Over time, more professional care in the form of nursing and other supportive care may be required medically, whether at home or in a long-term care facility. There is evidence that case management can improve care for individuals with dementia and the experience of their caregivers. Furthermore, case management may reduce overall cost and institutional care in the medium term. Millions of people living in the United States take care of a friend or family member with Alzheimer’s disease or a related dementia.

Family caregivers
The role of family caregivers has become more prevalent; care in the familiar surroundings of home may delay onset of some symptoms and postpone or eliminate the need for more professional and costly levels of care. Home-based care may entail tremendous economic, emotional costs as well.  Family caregivers often give up time from work and forego pay in order to spend an average of 47 hours per week with an affected loved one, who frequently cannot be left alone.  In a 2006 survey of patients with long-term care insurance, the direct and indirect costs of caring for an Alzheimer's disease patient averaged $77,500 per year in the United States.

Caregivers are themselves subject to increased incidence of depression, anxiety, and, in some cases, physical health issues. According to a UK-based study, almost two out of three carers of people with dementia feel lonely. Most of the carers in the study were family members of friends.

Research shows that African Americans face a more significant burden in Alzheimer’s care management and will face more negative life changes and health outcomes due to providing care. African Americans are twice as likely to be diagnosed with dementia than other ethnic groups, and caregivers often materialize as secondary patients due to the severe impact of caregiving on health and well-being. Additionally, according to the Alzheimer’s Association and NAC/AARP, 60% of Alzheimer’s disease and dementia caregivers are typically female and are 55 or older.  This data emphasizes that African Americans are disproportionately affected by Alzheimer’s disease and other dementias; therefore, understanding caregivers’ subjective stress is urgent.

Schulz et al. concluded in a US study that "the transition to institutional care is particularly difficult for spouses, almost half of whom visit the patient daily and continue to provide help with physical care during their visits. Clinical interventions that better prepare the caregiver for a placement transition and treat their depression and anxiety following placement may be of great benefit to these individuals."  Thommessen et al. found in a Norwegian study that the most common stressors reported were "disorganization of household routines, difficulties with going away for holidays, restrictions on social life, and the disturbances of sleep..." and that this was common to carers for dementia, stroke and Parkinson's disease patients.  In a Japanese study, Hirono et al. assessed that "the patients' functional and neuropsychiatric impairments were the main patient factors which increased the caregiver's burden."  Activities are important for the dementia patient because it keeps them cognitive  functioning. The caregiver should aid them in their activities, but should not do it for them. An Italian study by Marvardi et al. found "that patients' behavioral disturbances and disability were the major predictors of the time-dependent burden; the psychophysical burden was explained mainly by caregiver anxiety and depression."

Caregivers may experience anticipatory grief and ambiguous loss, and research shows that African American caregivers are less likely to seek help for grief and depression than their Caucasian counterparts. Furthermore, physiological changes such as increased cortisol levels, the body’s primary stress hormone, contribute to impaired cognitive function, perpetuating the problem of Alzheimer’s disease within the African American community since stress is a known causal.

While family caregivers often care for patients with dementia at home, they also provide a helpful function within nursing or residential aged care facilities. Findings from a 2021 systematic review found caregivers of these patients in nursing homes with dementia do not have sufficient tools or clinical guidance for helping to manage multiple interventions, such as behavioral and psychological symptoms of dementia (BPSD) and medication use. Nurses should provide information to the caregiver on how to take care of the dementia patient so the caregiver does not neglect them.

Respite or day care
Caring for someone with dementia is accompanied by many emotional and physical challenges. Respite care is designed to give rest or relief to caregivers.  A  2014 study did not report any benefits or detrimental effects from the use of  these interventions. However, these results may be due to the lack of high quality studies in this field.

Now from a systematic review from 2016 there is information that respite services provided to families with a relative with dementia does give positive support and help reduce stress. It has also been found that those who use respite services provided by a nursing home or other facility have the possibility of the family member with dementia being moved into one of these places sooner than those who do not use this service, while early utilization of in-home help services may delay institutionalization.

Respite care benefits caregivers in ways such as providing time for relaxation, for socialization with others and for taking care of personal tasks. Caregivers need time for themselves, so they do not experience burnout. See also Caregiver stress and Memory and aging.

Respite care can take place in many different settings depending on the needs of those involved. It can be done in adult daycare facilities or at nursing homes that provide respite services. Many times another family member can also come into the home.

Environmental design

A 2010 review summarizes what is known about best practices for safe and stimulating environments for dementia. Architects in designs for aging in place can consider the relationship of the built environment to the functioning and well-being of seniors.

The environment that a person with dementia lives in is very important. Nurses should help to provide a healthy environment for people with dementia. A negative frustrated atmosphere from the nurses could lead to emotional neglect to the patients. Nursing home managers do not understand how to take care of their dementia patients either, which could lead to a chaotic and hostile environment. It should be conducive to relaxation, stimulating, and engaging. A 2014 cross sectional quantitative study showed that while the nurses were less stressed, so were the residents. Nurses who were working in a calm environment decreased stress levels. The environment in which those with dementia live should foster their ability to be a participant and not just an observer in their life and include opportunities for independence. Their environment should allow them to keep their identity. Including things that are personal to them and that serve as reminders of their identity are important and meaningful. This personal environment should also be a place where if needed they can have privacy. The areas should also be well lit with minimal items on the ground to reduce risks of falling or injury.

The environment where those with dementia eat their meals should be inviting and foster conversation and socialization. Items designed specifically to help individuals with dementia can also be helpful, such as industrial designer Sha Yao's tableware that both has the colorful and unique design that stimulate people with dementia and has other features that address cognitive, motor, and physical impairments that often arise.

Things to for people with dementia would be:

 Try to keep a routine, such as bathing, dressing, and eating at the same time each day.
 Help the person write down to-do lists, appointments, and events in a notebook or calendar.
 Plan activities that the person enjoys and try to do them at the same time each day.
 Consider a system or reminders for helping those who must take medications regularly.
 When dressing or bathing, allow the person to do as much as possible.
 Buy loose-fitting, comfortable, easy-to-use clothing, such as clothes with elastic waistbands, fabric fasteners, or large zipper pulls instead of shoelaces, buttons, or buckles.
 Use a sturdy shower chair to support a person who is unsteady and to prevent falls. You can buy shower chairs at drug stores and medical supply stores.
 Be gentle and respectful. Tell the person what you are going to do, step by step while you help them bathe or get dressed.
 Serve meals in a consistent, familiar place and give the person enough time to eat.

Communicating

Caring for someone with dementia is especially challenging due to the fact that dementia patients soon lose the ability to speak or otherwise communicate and seem unable to understand what's said to them. Since dementia patients have trouble communicating their needs, this can be frustrating for the nurse. Nurses may have a hard time making relationships with their dementia patients because of the communication barrier. How the dementia patient feels is based on their social interactions and they may feel neglected because of this barrier. Nurses feel pain and helpless when caring for a dementia patient. Care approaches known variously as patient-centered care or comfort-centered care attempt to address the difficulty in communication between caregiver and patient. These terms are used in reference to all patient populations, not just dementia patients.

To communicate with dementia patients who have lost their ability to communicate in traditional ways, nontraditional forms of communication are used. Paying attention to eye movements, facial expressions and body movements can help caregivers understand them a little better. In the study by Ellis and Astell it was found that as researchers imitated the sounds and body language of the dementia patients, they engaged even more with the researcher. As each person is affected by dementia differently, a unique form of communication may need to be established. Nurses must use therapeutic communication while talking to patients. Therapeutic lying is a tool that nurses use to re ensure the patient that they are okay and it's used in situations that would not harm the patient in any way. Even though they may be nonverbal that does not always conclude they no longer wish to participate in the world around them.

Memory strategies
Some studies have demonstrated emotional memory enhancement in Alzheimer's patients suggesting that emotional memory enhancement might be used in the daily management of Alzheimer's patients. One study found that objects are recalled significantly better in Alzheimer's patients if they were presented as birthday presents to AD patients.

Assistive technology 
A 2017, Cochrane Review highlighted the current lack of high-quality evidence to determine whether assistive technology effectively supports people with dementia to manage memory issues. Thus, it is not presently sure whether or not assistive technology is beneficial for memory problems.

Psychological and psychosocial therapies 
A 2018, Cochrane Review found that offering personally tailored activity sessions to people with dementia in long-term care homes may help manage challenging behavior. No evidence supported the idea that activities were better if they matched the individual interests of people. The findings are based on low-certainty evidence from eight studies. At the same time a program showed that simple measures like talking to people about their interest can improve the quality of life for care home residents living with dementia. The program showed that such simple measures reduced residents' agitation and depression. They also needed fewer GP visits and hospital admissions, which also meant that the program was cost-saving.

Nursing
In the acute care setting a fair number of individuals diagnosed with dementia suffer from hip fractures. For that reason, nurses are in high demand to care for this population. When taking care of the elderly who are cognitively impaired it is challenging to assess if one is experiencing pain. Missed nursing care is common when taking care of patients with dementia. Some nurses may prioritize other patients based on the stage of their dementia and their age. Missed care could lead to complications such as falls, infections, and incontinence. Pain is commonly defined as a subjective feeling that is best understood by the patient. Because of this, nurses tend to rely on verbal statements from patients to detect whether one is hurting. Due to diminished verbal skills in this population it can increase the risk of inadequately assessing ones' needs, including if they are in pain. Research has shown that patients not being able to express themselves is the number one barrier when it comes to caring for the elderly.

As the population continues to age, the numbers of patients in hospital settings with dementia will most likely increase. To prevent the elderly with dementia from receiving inadequate recognition of pain nurses should use common sense to aid in assessments. Interpreting body language has been shown effective in relieving discomfort. Another way to improve perception of pain is getting to know the patient better through family members’ eyes. Obtaining further information about the patient from family members helps make the connection to normal behaviors. Although some of these pain-relieving strategies are beneficial there still is a lack of research focused on dementia patients in the acute care setting.Unfortunately many nurses are not taught on how to take care of patients with dementia. Many programs that nurses go through that are provided by their facilities, a little less than half of nurses do not feel comfortable actually using that training on their patients. As a result, this puts an increased risk of strain on nurses and patients.

In general, however, the unfamiliar environment and routinized practices of the acute care setting can be particularly challenging for people living with dementia. The absence of family and familiar surroundings, on top of the physical issue leading to the admission, heightens anxieties, confusion and distress. Challenges in communication not only impact effective pain medication, but also affect hydration, nutrition and all aspects of physical and emotional care. Whilst these challenges have long been recognized, it remains an ongoing issue, and has been further impacted by the COVID-19 pandemic.  A person-centered care approach helps alleviate some of the unfamiliar stress from being in the acute care environment, and can also benefit those caring for people with dementia in this setting.  Implementing best practice in dementia care needs a hospital wide approach. Increases to workforce capacity, physical environments that support familiarisation, social interaction and activities, inclusive carer policies and cultures of sharing knowledge have all shown promise in improving dementia care in the acute-care setting.

Incontinence care 
People with dementia are more likely to have problems with incontinence: they are three times more likely to have urinary and four times more likely to have fecal incontinence compared to people of similar ages. This can have a profound impact on the dignity and quality of life on people with dementia and their carers.

There is a general lack of understanding and stigma around incontinence. Professionals also lack knowledge and training when it comes to incontinence in people with dementia. Poorly-managed incontinence also has severe negative impact physically, psychologically, economically and socially on people with dementia living at home and their informal carers.

Guidelines suggest that treatment should always be preferred to containment as pads and catheterisation can be uncomfortable and negatively affect the person's dignity. However the continence problems of people with dementia are different than of those without and the care strategy should take their and their carers' different perspectives into account. There are guidelines for the continence care needs of people with complex health conditions such as the Continence Care Framework.

At home 
THE EVIDEM-C research program looked at how to improve care for people with dementia living at home. They identified priorities for action: the importance of early clinical assessment (rather than using pads); promoting continence through a balanced diet, exercise and hand hygiene; encouraging and helping toilet use; and a sensitive management of incontinence to secure the person's dignity.

In care homes 
Among people with dementia living in care homes the rates of fecal incontinence are between 30% and 50%. This generally occurs alongside urinary incontinence but around 30% of people in care homes have only urinary incontinence. According to research in the UK, continence care should be individualized with the aim of promoting personal dignity. New measures should take into account the preferences and personal history of the affected person. Appropriate diet and mobility can help and prompts to go to the toilet should be preferred over using pads. For supporting and encouraging toilet use, staff needs practical training and an understanding of how dementia affects continence.

In hospitals 
In a hospital context, the care of continence is often poor. This can lead to worse clinical outcomes for people with dementia, a higher risk of infection and the development of urinary and fecal incontinence. After clinical assessment, a personalized continence plan should be created which includes identifying  reversible causes and contributing factors. Continence problems in people with dementia are at the same time communication challenges. Staff need to be sensitive to the affected people's specific, verbal and non-verbal cues as they might have difficulties expressing their needs around continence. The language used should respect dignity and shouldn't cause embarrassment. An ethnographic study in the UK pointed out the existence of "pad culture" which means that the main care strategy was the use of continence pads even in cases where people were continent. The main reasons for this strategy were fears about safety and falls which kept people in their beds and did not support independence. This mode of caring often lead to undignified situations and the use of demeaning language.

See also 

 Clinical Geropsychology
 Carers rights movement
 Direct support professional
 Personal Care Assistant

References

Further reading 

 Next Step in Care: free, downloadable resources for family caregivers and health care providers
 
 
 
 
 
 
 
 
 

 Norbergh, K.-G., Helin, Y., Dahl, A., Hellzén, O., & Asplund, K. (2006). Nurses’ Attitudes Towards People with Dementia: the semantic differential technique. Nursing Ethics, 13(3), 264–274. https://doi.org/10.1191/0969733006ne863oa

Dementia
Alzheimer's disease
Elderly care
Dementia